Metro Manila, Philippines, is located in the hydraulically complex Pasig River—Marikina River—Laguna de Bay watershed, which includes more than thirty tributaries within the urban area.

The following list is sorted by name, with a brief description of each. Boldface indicates the body of water is a major channel.

Rivers

Creeks, estuaries, channels

See also
 List of rivers of the Philippines
 Manggahan Floodway

References

External links

Rivers of Metro Manila
Rivers in Manila
Rivers in Manila